Lipotactes is a genus of bush crickets found in southern China, Indo-China and Malesia; it is the only living genus in the subfamily Lipotactinae.

Species
The Orthoptera Species File lists the following:
subgenus Analipotactes Gorochov, 2021
 Lipotactes amicus Gorochov, 1993
subgenus Dialipotactes Gorochov, 2021
 Lipotactes maculatus Hebard, 1922
subgenus Eulipotactes Gorochov, 2021
 Lipotactes azureus Gorochov, 1996
 Lipotactes dorsaspina Chang, Shi & Ran, 2005
 Lipotactes orlovi Gorochov, 1996
 Lipotactes proximus Gorochov, 1996
 Lipotactes serratus Ingrisch, 2021
 Lipotactes vietnamicus Gorochov, 1993
subgenus Lipotactes Brunner von Wattenwyl, 1898
 Lipotactes alienus Brunner von Wattenwyl, 1898 - type species (4 subspp.: L. alienus alienus)
 Lipotactes angulatus Ingrisch, 2021
 Lipotactes concolor (Kästner, 1933)
 Lipotactes digitatus (Karny, 1931)
 Lipotactes kabili Tan, Japir & Chung, 2020
 Lipotactes laminus Shi & Li, 2009
 Lipotactes macrognathus (Ingrisch, 1995)
 Lipotactes minutus Ingrisch, 1995
 Lipotactes ovatus (Ingrisch, 1995)
 Lipotactes parvus (Ingrisch, 1995)
 Lipotactes sinicus (Bey-Bienko, 1959)
 Lipotactes sulcatus Ingrisch, 1995
 Lipotactes sumatranus Gorochov, 2021
 Lipotactes tripyrga Chang, Shi & Ran, 2005
 Lipotactes truncatus Shi & Li, 2009
 Lipotactes virescens Ingrisch, 1995
subgenus Miolipotactes Gorochov, 2021
 Lipotactes minutissimus Gorochov, 2008
subgenus Mortoniellus Griffini, 1909
 Lipotactes karnyi (Griffini, 1909)
subgenus Neolipotactes Gorochov, 2021
 Lipotactes montanus Ingrisch, 1990
 Lipotactes silvestris Ingrisch, 1990
subgenus Prolipotactes Gorochov, 2021
 Lipotactes hamatus (Karny, 1931)
 Lipotactes siebersi Ingrisch, 1995
subgenus Sublipotactes Gorochov, 2021
 Lipotactes discus Ingrisch, 2021
 Lipotactes ingrischi Gorochov, 1996
 Lipotactes khmericus Gorochov, 1998
subgenus not determined
 Lipotactes azuriventer Karny, 1924
 Lipotactes longicauda Ingrisch, 1995
 Lipotactes vittifemur Karny, 1924

References

External links

Flickr: David Ball - Lipotactes maculatus female

Orthoptera genera
Tettigoniidae
Orthoptera of Asia